Gabriel Alejandro Loeschbor (born 4 June 1977 in Santa Fe) is an Argentine retired football defender.

Career 

Gabriel Loeschbor started his career in 1997 with Rosario Central where he played until 2001 reaching the semi-finals of that year's Copa Libertadores. Later that same year he moved to Racing Club and helped the club to end a 35-year drought by winning the Apertura 2001 championship. Loeschbor was a usual first team player during the tournament and he scored the championship goal in the last game against Vélez Sársfield.

Being part of a championship winning team brought him to the attention of several European clubs. The defender was signed by French club Rennes in 2002. After one season with Rennes Loeschbor moved to Spain to play for Real Murcia.

In 2004, he returned to Argentina where he played for San Lorenzo and River Plate and had a second spell with Rosario Central. In 2006, he signed for Arsenal de Sarandí, where he qualified with the team for the Copa Sudamericana and Copa Libertadores, and in 2007 he moved to Gimnasia de Jujuy, where he avoided relegation at the end of the 2007–08 season.

Personal
Loeschbor holds a German passport.

Titles

References

External links
 Argentine Primera statistics at Fútbol XXI  
 
 

1977 births
Living people
Footballers from Santa Fe, Argentina
Argentine people of German descent
Argentine footballers
Association football defenders
Argentine Primera División players
Rosario Central footballers
Racing Club de Avellaneda footballers
Ligue 1 players
Stade Rennais F.C. players
Real Murcia players
San Lorenzo de Almagro footballers
Club Atlético River Plate footballers
Arsenal de Sarandí footballers
Gimnasia y Esgrima de Jujuy footballers
Independiente Rivadavia footballers
Club Atlético Belgrano footballers
Argentine expatriate footballers
Expatriate footballers in France
Expatriate footballers in Spain
Argentine expatriate sportspeople in France
Argentine expatriate sportspeople in Spain